Arati Vaidya (born 2 July 1970) is an Indian former cricketer who played as a left-handed batter. She appeared in three Test matches and six One Day Internationals for India between 1995 and 1999. She played domestic cricket for Maharashtra, Railways and Mumbai.

References

External links
 
 

Living people
1970 births
Cricketers from Pune
Indian women cricketers
India women Test cricketers
India women One Day International cricketers
Maharashtra women cricketers
Railways women cricketers
Mumbai women cricketers